Kunal Kishore Kapoor (born 18 October 1977) is an Indian actor, model, film producer, writer, entrepreneur and co-founder of Ketto Online Crowdfunding. Kunal works predominantly in Hindi films. He is best known for playing Sam in Shah Rukh Khan's Don 2 (2011).

Early life 
Kapoor was born in Mumbai on 18 October 1977. His father, Kishore Kapoor was in the construction business and his mother, Kanan is a singer and homemaker. His parents are originally from Amritsar, Punjab. He is the youngest of three children, with two sisters Geeta and Reshma.

Personal life 
In February 2015, Kapoor married Naina Bachchan, niece of Amitabh Bachchan, in a private family ceremony in Seychelles. A celebration dinner was held on 11 April 2015 in New Delhi. On 31 January 2022 the couple announced the birth of a baby boy.

Acting career 
Kapoor trained for an acting career under Barry John, and became a part of Motley, a theatre group run by acting legend Naseeruddin Shah. He began his career as an assistant director of Aks, which starred Manoj Bajpayee and in which Amitabh Bachchan played a major character.

Kapoor made his movie debut as the male lead opposite Tabu in Meenaxi: A Tale of Three Cities (2004) which was helmed by painter MF Hussain. His next film was the Aamir Khan starrer Rang De Basanti (2006), for which he received a nomination in the Filmfare Best Supporting Actor Award category. The film was successful both critically and commercially, and it was nominated in the Best Foreign Film category at the 2007 BAFTA Awards.

Yash Raj Films (YRF) studio subsequently signed Kapoor for a three-film contract. He appeared in films like Laaga Chunari Mein Daag (2007), Aaja Nachle (2007) and Bachna Ae Haseeno (2008). After this, Kapoor took a break for two years, and then appeared in national award winner Rahul Dholakia's Lamhaa (2010) starring Sanjay Dutt. The film didn't do well but Kapoor received accolades for his performance as a young Kashmiri politician. Critics hailed it as "One of the most powerful performances of the year". That same year, Kapoor voiced the Indian God Rama in Mahayoddha Rama, an animation film made by Raizada Rohit Jaising Vaid. In 2011, he appeared in the Shahrukh Khan starrer Don 2, where his performance was appreciated.

In 2012, Kapoor played the lead role in Sameer Sharma's light-hearted comedy film Luv Shuv Tey Chicken Khurana which he co-wrote. The film received positive reviews and was hailed by critics as being amongst the ten best films of the year. The New York Times reviewed it favourably and called Kapoor the Indian Matthew McConaughey. In 2014, he appeared in the off-beat comedy film Kaun Kitne Paani Mein.

Kapoor's next films to release were the epic action trilingual film, Veeram, directed by National Award winner Jayaraj, Gauri Shinde's next and Tigmanshu Dhulia's war drama Raagdesh based on the Indian National Army trials. In 2017, he starred in  Gold based on the first Indian hockey team to win a Gold at the Olympics, the film saw him pairing up with Akshay Kumar for the first time. It was released on 15 August 2018.

In 2021 Kapoor had three releases. The first one was the T series production 'Koi Jaane Na' Followed by Disney Hotstars show 'The Empire' The show which is the most expensive series to come out of India, was a huge success and Kapoor received a lot of critical acclaim for it. He received an award as Best Actor on OTT for his performance. This was followed by the Netflix anthology 'Ankahi Kahaniyan' for which he once again received a lot of critical acclaim.

Other work
Kapoor has endorsed popular brands like Thums Up, Indian Terrain, Ray-Ban, Pepsico brand Kurkure and Save the Children charity along with Gwyneth Paltrow.

In 2009, Kapoor started writing weekly columns for HT City, the lifestyle supplement of the Hindustan Times. These columns ended in November 2009 but still appear online on the social network Desimartini.

He is a trained pilot and rally car driver. In 2014, he started training for the Formula Three. He co-founded Asia's largest crowdfunding platform called Ketto, which raises money for social and individual causes. To date, the platform has raised close to 120 million dollars.

He is also known for his style and has been voted amongst the most stylish men in the country. He was on GQ's list of the top ten stylish men in the country.

Filmography

Actor 
 All films are in Hindi unless otherwise noted.

Assistant director

Awards and nominations
2006: Star's Sabsey Favourite Naya Hero
2007: Stardust Breakthrough Performance, Male

See also 
Kunal (disambiguation)

References

External links 
 

Indian male film actors
Living people
Punjabi people
Male actors from Delhi
Male actors in Hindi cinema
1977 births